Victoria School (VS) is a government autonomous boys' secondary school in Siglap, Singapore. Established in 1876, it is Singapore's second oldest state secondary school. It offers a six-year Integrated Programme, which allows students to skip the Singapore-Cambridge GCE Ordinary Level examinations and proceed to Victoria Junior College for Years 5 and 6 and take the Singapore-Cambridge GCE Advanced Level examinations at the end of Year 6.

History

Kampong Glam: 1876-1900
Victoria School began in 1876 as an English class for 12 Malay boys at Kampong Glam Malay Branch School. The first headmaster was Y. A. Yzelman.

Syed Alwi: 1900-1933
In 1900, Kampong Glam Malay Branch School merged with Kampong Glam Malay School and moved to Syed Alwi Road near the Victoria Bridge, so the school was renamed Victoria Bridge School. At the time, it was a feeder school for secondary schools, including Raffles Institution, then the only government secondary school in Singapore. In 1909, Victoria Bridge School added classes for Standard Five to alleviate the enrolment pressure at Raffles Institution. In 1931, it became the second government secondary school in Singapore.

Many students left school at age 13 so from 1930 to 1952, the school operated an afternoon session for continuing education. The school uniform was introduced by 1929, and a school library was opened in December 1929 with the aid of businessman Syed Ahmed bin Mohamed Alsagoff. During this period, school games were formalised, with the first annual sports meet being held in 1915. The first annual Speech Day was held in 1916 and the first annual academic prizes were awarded. The house system was instituted in 1929 while the house prefect system began in 1930. The first Boy Scouts troop was formed in 1919,

When Victoria Bridge School was at Syed Alwi Road, the school had a recommended maximum enrolment of 560. However, by 1925, it had 705 students. Victoria Bridge School's campus at Syed Alwi Road is depicted on the back of the S$2 banknote in the current series.

Tyrwhitt Road: 1933–1984
In 1933, Victoria Bridge School moved to Tyrwhitt Road and changed its name to its current name, Victoria School. In 1935, the primary classes were phased out and the school became a district secondary school. The school motto, Nil Sine Labore (Latin for "nothing without labour"), was adopted before World War II.

During the Japanese occupation of Singapore between 1942 and 1945, Victoria School continued operating as a Japanese school called Jalan Besar Boys' School. Following the end of the war, Victoria School reopened with 16 pupils on 1 October 1945 as one of the first schools in Singapore to resume classes. It was housed at the Kampong Glam Malay School site until May 1946 since the Tyrwhitt Road building was used as a hospital. Under the headmaster R. F. Bomford's leadership, a science block was constructed for the school. At the time, Victoria School had the best school laboratories in Singapore, attracting students from Raffles Girls' School and St. Andrew's School to take science lessons at Victoria School. It was also selected as Singapore's pioneer school for audio-visual education.

Post-School Certificate (now the Singapore-Cambridge GCE Advanced Level) classes began in 1951 and included the first girls to attend the school. In 1955, the school achieved the best results in Singapore in the examinations for the Cambridge Overseas School Certificate (present-day Singapore-Cambridge GCE Ordinary Level), with a 99.5% pass rate. In 1957, it had the best results in Singapore for the University Entrance Examinations. In 1969, after Singapore introduced the junior college system, Victoria School started offering three-year pre-university courses in 1979.

The school building was designed by Frank Dorrington Ward, the chief architect of the Public Works Department who also designed the Supreme Court Building and other prominent landmarks in Singapore. It was upgraded in 1966 and gazetted for conservation by the Urban Redevelopment Authority (URA) in 2007. It is one of the few early city-centre schools still in existence and features two school buildings from the pre- and post-war period on a single site. The hall-and-canteen block is the only known school hall left of this style and configuration in Singapore. The site was awarded the URA Heritage Award in 2009. It is a marked-out historical landmark of the Jalan Besar Heritage Trail. It became the headquarters of the People's Association in 2010.

Geylang Bahru: 1984–2003
In 1984, Victoria School moved to 3 Geylang Bahru Lane. The new site's move was marked with a 2.3  km march by 1,500 present and former students, teachers, and principals from Tyrwhitt Road, led by Abbas Abu Amin, Member of Parliament for Pasir Panjang GRC who was an alumnus of Victoria School. Students preferred the junior colleges to the pre-university programme, so Victoria Junior College was established that year as a separate institution and the school ended its pre-university intake, with the last group of students sitting for the Singapore-Cambridge GCE Advanced Level examinations in November 1985.

The school began offering the Art Elective Programme in 1985 and set up its first computer laboratory in 1986. The first Victoria Challenge was inaugurated in 1987, and the Victorian Profile began in 1991.

In 1989, Victoria School was a small number of schools chosen to receive overseas scholars from the ASEAN countries. After the introduction of national ranking by the Ministry of Education in 1992, the school placed in the top ten in four years of that decade. The school became the seventh Gifted Education Programme centre in 2001 and hosted the programme until 2005.

Single-session schooling began in 1992 after the extension of the school building the previous year. The school opted to remain a government school and not become independent; it was selected to become one of the first six autonomous schools in 1994.

Siglap Link: 2003–present
The campus at Siglap Link off Marine Parade Road opened in 2003, incorporating a hostel. It was designed on ecological principles to reflect the school's values, with roofs curved like an open book and the school centred on the library. At its opening, it had the largest government secondary school library in Singapore. The campus was selected to participate at the 9th International Architecture Exhibition in Venice. The ceremonial procession to the new campus was attended by President S. R. Nathan, who was an alumnus of Victoria School.

In 2008, Victoria School became the first school in Singapore to offer Physical Education as a subject examinable at the Singapore-Cambridge GCE Ordinary Level. It also became one of the first four secondary schools to offer the Regional Studies Programme, and the only one offering Bahasa Indonesia.

The school began offering the six-year Integrated Programme through the Victoria-Cedar Alliance, together with Cedar Girls' Secondary School and Victoria Junior College, in 2012.

Campus and facilities
Between the classroom block and the science block, the "Eco-Street," planted with tropical vegetation and houses fish and turtles, forms a central artery providing natural light and ventilation to the classrooms and a setting for outdoor learning. The Victoria Pool, Learning Garden, Bio Pod, and Exploration Patch represent a move away from rigidly-structured, classroom-based instruction.

The ground-level classrooms, known as Learning Studios (consisting of the Gentlemen, Professional, and Sportsmen rooms), are air-conditioned and have sliding doors that open out to the landscape. Some classrooms on the upper floors have balconies, which were originally intended to take advantage of the sea view, but these are closed for safety reasons, and the Indoor Sports Hall now blocks most of the view.

The school facilities also include a 500-seater auditorium and a three-storey library, of which the third floor is reserved for teachers and contains a collection of teaching resources.

Victoria Hall
Victoria Hall is a hostel consisting of two 11-storey blocks (one male and one female) within the school compound. It is next to the sea and East Coast Park, giving boarders both a refreshing sea view and convenient access to the park's sporting facilities. It houses about 500 boarders of several nationalities, including Vietnamese, Thai, and Chinese, many of whom attend either Victoria School or Victoria Junior College. Secondary/Year 3 students also stay at the hostel for six weeks. Three classes attend this programme in Term 1, four classes in Term 2, and three classes in Term 3.

Sports facilities
A S$500,000 AstroTurf field replaced the conventional field in early 2007.

The Indoor Sports Hall (ISH)) was completed in June 2009. It consists of two storeys, but the building's height is approximately seven storeys because of the high ceiling.

The school also has an air-rifle range, a tennis and basketball court, a fitness corner, and a gymnasium.

Computer facilities
The school is mostly covered by a wi-fi network (SWN) provided by the Ministry of Education for the use of teachers and students.

Culture and tradition

Uniform
The school uniform consists of a white short-sleeved shirt, with either khaki short trousers (for Year 1 and 2 students) or white long trousers (for Year 3 and 4 students). A 'Victoria' label is sewn on the back pockets of the trousers. Secondary 3 and 4 students wear a black school belt. The school socks are white with the initials 'VS' in red on both sides, although plain white socks are allowed. Shoes have to be at least 80% white. In 2005, an official 'Victoria School' shoe with the letters 'VS' on each side was introduced.

Students wear a maroon striped tie every Monday and on formal occasions, sometimes with a maroon blazer as well. The school badge is worn above the left chest pocket. Student bodies such as the Prefectorial Board, Peer Support Board, and Monitors' Council have their own badges, but the school crest remains their main feature.

For physical activities and camps, students wear a bright yellow 'bumblebee' T-shirt with a pair of black shorts and white socks with sports shoes. The word 'VICTORIAN' is printed on the back of the PE T-shirt.

House system
The students are grouped into five houses, namely Glam (red), Kallang (blue), Kapor (green), Rochore (yellow), and Whampoa (purple), which compete against each other in the school's annual Sports Day, Cross-Country Championships and during Inter-house games and since 2019, Project APEX. Each house has its own running vest (singlet) in the house colours.

Victorian Spirit
The Victorian Spirit is a sense of pride and belonging to the school, a fighting spirit, and striving to be their best.

Special programmes
Victoria School offers the Integrated Programme, GCE Ordinary Level Physical Education Programme, Art Elective Programme, Regional Studies Programme, and Higher Mother Tongue Languages in Chinese, Malay, and Tamil. VS students may also enrol in the Music Elective Programme in Secondary Three or a third language (French, German or Japanese). However, these lessons are held at external venues. Students of foreign languages take part in the Ministry of Education Language Centre's month-long Study-cum-Immersion Programmes (SCIP) in countries such as France, Germany, and Japan.

Victoria-Cedar Alliance Integrated Programme 
The Victoria-Cedar Alliance Integrated Programme is a six-year Integrated Programme that allows students to bypass the Singapore-Cambridge GCE Ordinary Level examinations and proceed directly to the Singapore-Cambridge GCE Advanced Level examinations at the end of the sixth year. Under this programme, students complete their four-year secondary education in Victoria School before moving to Victoria Junior College for Years 5 and 6 for pre-university education.

Victoria School started offering the Integrated Programme together with Cedar Girls' Secondary School and Victoria Junior College in 2012, building upon the success of the original four-year Victoria Integrated Programme started by Victoria Junior College in 2005.

GCE Physical education
In 2008, Victoria School became the first school in Singapore to offer Physical Education (PE) as an examinable subject at the GCE Ordinary Level after receiving the approval of the Ministry of Education in 2006. The course involves theoretical and practical aspects, including weight training, football, hockey, and cross-country running, among others.

Students take the theory examination at the end of the course (i.e., November of the graduating year). This examination contributes 40% of their overall grade, the other 60% coming from the practical component, assessed over a period of time.

To better acquaint students with the style of GCE Ordinary Level PE lessons, PE theory lessons are also conducted in lower secondary classes as an examinable subject. The selection process for GCE Ordinary Level PE candidates is carried out towards the end of secondary two. Students whose applications have been approved by the PE Department are notified before the subject combination allocation process at the end of the school year.

Art Elective Programme 
The Art Elective Programme (AEP) leads to the GCE Ordinary Level Higher Art examination. The AEP is offered to academically good students with talent in art. For lower secondary classes, the AEP class is not entirely made up of AEP students. Usually, about a third of the class will take AEP lessons, while the other two-thirds will have Home Economics or Design & Technology lessons. For upper secondary classes, AEP lessons are conducted after normal school hours.

Regional Studies Programme 
Students in the Regional Studies Programme (RSP) learn about Southeast Asian culture and contemporary society. The curriculum includes overseas immersion programmes and structured enrichment modules spread throughout the course. Other schools in Singapore that have the Regional Studies Programme offer Malay as a third language, but since the Singapore Indonesian School is situated opposite Victoria School's campus at Siglap, students in the RSP programme take Indonesian as a third language.

VECTORS
VECTORS is a school-based talent programme aimed at nurturing students who demonstrate high abilities in mathematics and science. Students are given a wide range of opportunities to learn beyond the curriculum, including enrichment modules at junior colleges, polytechnics and universities, research mentorships, and other institutions.

Co-curricular activities
The school offers students 40 co-curricular activities (CCAs) in the four areas of sports, uniformed groups, performing arts, and clubs and societies.

The school holds performing arts and sporting activities, including the biennial Rhapsody, Drama Festival (Dramafest), Musical World, Arts Festival, and Evening of Music and Drama (EMD), the annual Sports Day and Cross-Country Championship.

Sports
13 sports are offered in Victoria School: badminton, cricket, cross-country, floorball, football, hockey, sailing, shooting, table-tennis, tennis, track & field, volleyball and wushu. The school also participates in the Inter-School Dragon Boat competition. Between 2009 and 2022, the school won 30 national team titles and 30 zonal team titles at the National Schools Games and achieved a national top-four placing 183 times. VS students have won five Singapore National Olympic Council Best Sportsboy/Team Awards and 20 Singapore Schools Sports Council Best School Boy Awards for sports.

Ten Victorians have represented Singapore at the Olympics - four in hockey, three in athletics, two in sailing and one in water-polo.

Uniformed groups
Victoria School has six uniformed groups, four national and two worldwide. They offer Secondary 2-3 students a combined cultural exchange trip overseas to place such as Perth and Hong Kong. All have won the best unit competitions in the 21st century.

 Boys' Brigade: J M Fraser Award for Excellence - 20th consecutive gold, 2017
 National Police Cadet Corps: NPCC Unit Overall Proficiency Award - 18th consecutive gold, 2017
 National Cadet Corps (Land): Best Unit Competition - silver, 2016
 Scouts - Arrow Scout Group: Frank Cooper Sands Award - 15th consecutive gold, 2019
 Red Cross: Red Cross Youth Excellent Unit Award - 9th consecutive gold, 2016
 National Cadet Corps (Sea): Best Unit Competition - gold, 2016

Scouting was first started in Victoria Bridge School (present day Victoria School) when the 5th Singapore (HQ Malay) Troop was formed on 28 March 1919. The 5th Troop was mentioned in the local newspaper in August 1950, but appears to have been disbanded shortly after. The 6th Troop was founded in 1922, when school-based Scouting was introduced in government schools. In 1932, the 6th Troop was renamed Arrow Scout Group after the Golden Arrow which BP had proclaimed in 1929's 3rd World Scout Jamboree as Scouting's symbol of peace and goodwill.

Performing arts
Victoria School has six performing arts groups.

Chinese orchestra
Victoria School Chinese Orchestra is one of the top school Chinese orchestras in Singapore. In the biennial Singapore Youth Festival (SYF), Victoria School Chinese Orchestra has always attained good results.

Choir
Victoria School Choir is one of the top school choirs in Singapore. In the Singapore Youth Festival Choral Judging Competition, the school has always attained a Gold with the Honours award. It has also won gold medals in international choir competitions. In the 2012 National Day Parade, the 300-strong Combined School Choir was formed by students from Victoria School and Cedar Girls' Secondary School.

Clubs and societies
 AV Club
 Photography Club
 Chess Club (consisting of International Chess Club and Chinese Chess Club)
 English Language Drama Club
 English Language Debate Society
 Infocomm Club

In The Straits Times National Youth Media Competition, Victoria School holds the best record among all the schools in Singapore, clinching the championship twice and runner-up position three times since the competition was inaugurated in 2005.

Community involvement programmes

Youth Day
On Youth Day, Victoria School boys attempt to 'paint the town yellow' as they go round nearby housing blocks in the neighbourhood collecting old newspapers and items for disposal. The boys are clad in their yellow PT kit so that they are easily identified.

President's Challenge
Victoria School participates in the President's Challenge every year. In 2004, each class did a specific activity to raise funds for the charity. Activities included washing cars, going door-to-door to do household chores for a donation. In 2005, the school held a watch design competition, and the best designs were made into real watches and put on sale. In 2006, booklets were sold containing art by past and present Victorians.

Victoria Challenge
Started in July 1987, the Victoria Challenge, conducted every four years, allows classes to identify tasks that will contribute to the school. The "challenge" itself is for classes to carefully plan their task and pledge to complete it within 24 hours. Special T-shirts have been designed for every Victoria Challenge since its inception. Past challenges have included creating miniature clay figurines, folding 3D origami eagles to hang in the library, drawing floor murals, and creating an "Arts Nook" in the corner of the school, complete with books and a piano. The latest Victoria Challenge was held on 28 June 2019 to 29 June 2019.

Overseas exchange programmes
Victoria School has established ties with schools abroad to promote Singaporean education and exchange ideas.

As part of the initiative to improve bilateral education links between Singapore and Malaysia, Victoria School has been linked up with Penang Free School, Malaysia by the Ministry of Education. Other schools with which Victoria School has bilateral exchange programmes include Hebei Baoding Yizhong, English School Attached to Guangdong University of Foreign Studies, Beijing Sanfan Zhongxue and Nan Hai Zhi Xin Zhongxue (all in the People's Republic of China), Modern School of Vasant Vihar (India), University of Griffith (Australia) and Sultan Omar Ali Saiffudin High School (Brunei).

Humanities trips
Victoria School offers week-long overseas humanities trips to ASEAN and other parts of Asia for secondary 1 to 3 students to increase awareness of other cultures and relate lessons to the real world. These have included a trip to Vietnam in 2019.

Camps

Secondary One bonding camp
During January, all secondary one Victorians attend a three-day, two-night camp, usually held at the school, where they participate in physical, interactive, and character-building activities designed to help them make new friends and adapt to the new secondary school environment. It is facilitated by some of the secondary three and secondary four seniors.

Secondary Three overseas adventure camp
In 2001, Victoria School became the first school in Singapore to send its entire secondary three students to an overseas camp. The camp, which used to be held typically in March, is now held in January concurrently with the secondary one and two cohort camps on Malaysia's farmland. The aim is to bond the new secondary three students and help them settle into their new classes after being streamed according to their subject combinations and expose them to life outside the confines of urban Singapore. Also, following the "EDGE" model of the school, the camp aims to "Grow" (Third letter of the acronym) the students into effective leaders as they will take over various leadership roles from the secondary four students. Rigorous activities, including rafting, trekking, river-crossing, and mountain-climbing, are held during the camp. From 2001 to 2010, the camp was held at Kahang Organic Rice Eco-Farm, Kahang town, located near Kluang, Johor. From 2011, the annual camp location was shifted to Tanjong Sutera Resort, Tanjung Sedili, near the town of Kota Tinggi, Johor.

Victoria Enhanced Leadership/Outdoor Camp Instructor Training Camp (VELOCI-T)
The VELOCI-T is a grueling 5-day outdoor camp that begins locally and continues overseas. External camp instructors run it in collaboration with selected Secondary Three junior leaders for that year. It has garnered praise for being one of the most difficult and effective leadership camps among local institutions. 100 Secondary Two students, nominated through CCA teachers and who will undertake leadership positions the following year, undergo rugged adventure activities, are trained to run camps, and conduct activities commonly carried out during outdoor camps, and learn the Five Practices of Exemplary Leadership through hands-on activities. Trainees have made an expedition on inflatable rafts and kayaks and climbed Gunung Arong. After the camp is concluded, the participants' performances are reviewed. Those who pass are promoted to Junior Leader (JL) or, upon further application and stringent selection, Senior Leader (SL). The JLs and SLs are informally called Red Shirts and Black Shirts after the shirts are awarded. They form the backbone of student leadership in VS and play an instrumental role in rallying and organising the student population.

Awards
In 2009, Victoria School was awarded the Ministry of Education's School Distinction Award (SDA).

Victoria School has also attained various CCA awards, such as the Sustained Achievement Awards for sports, performing arts, and uniformed groups in recognition of its consistently high performance in national competitions, sports meets, the biennial Singapore Youth Festival and other events.

Victoria Advisory Committee
The Victoria Advisory Committee (VAC), formed in 1968, set the direction and advice on the future of Victoria School and Victoria Junior College. The principals of VS and VJC and the President of the Old Victorians' Association sit on the committee.

Victoria Chorale
Formed in 1988, Victoria Chorale, which comprises Victoria School and Victoria Junior College's graduands, is one of the top semi-professional choirs in Singapore. It has won numerous prizes at many prestigious international competitions, including gold medals at the Choir Olympics.

Old Victorians' Association

The alumni body, Old Victorians' Association (OVA), was established in 1941. It serves as a channel for former students of Victoria School and Victoria Junior College to associate with their alma mater. The OVA supports the schools' activities, assists needy students, and promotes sports, social and cultural activities among association members. Previously alumni returned on Victorians' Day, the first Saturday of March, to play games, eat school canteen food again and catch up with long-time schoolmates.

The OVA men's and women's hockey teams play in the Singapore Hockey Federation hockey leagues.

In 2009, OVA organized the inaugural combined VS and VJC gala concert, with a 260-strong cast comprising both students and celebrity alumni, at the Esplanade Concert Hall.

In 2011 and 2016, OVA organized the Victoria School 135th and 140th Anniversary Celebration Dinners at Tyrwhitt Road's former VS campus.

Notable alumni

Recipients of the President's Scholarship, Queen's Scholarship or State Scholarship

Presidents of Singapore
 Yusof Ishak, first President of Singapore
 Devan Nair, third President of Singapore
 S. R. Nathan, sixth President of Singapore

People's Action Party members of parliament (MPs)
 Abbas Abu Amin, former MP for Pasir Panjang GRC
 S. Dhanabalan, former Cabinet minister and MP for Toa Payoh GRC
 Lim Biow Chuan, former Deputy Speaker of Parliament, MP for Mountbatten SMC
 Ong Chit Chung, former Senior Parliamentary Secretary and MP for Jurong GRC
 Sha'ari Tadin, former Senior Parliamentary Secretary and MP for Bedok and Chai Chee
 Teo Ser Luck, former Minister of State and MP for Pasir Ris–Punggol GRC

Other politicians
 Abdul Samad Ismail, Malaysian politician and journalist
 Aziz Ishak, Malaysian former Cabinet minister
 Eu Chooi Yip, Malayan communist leader
 Sardon Jubir, Malaysian former Cabinet minister and former Governor of Penang

Public service
 Ahmad Mohamed Ibrahim, first non-British Attorney-General of Singapore
 Koh Eng Tian, former Solicitor-General of Singapore
 David Neo, Chief of Army
 Neo Kian Hong, sixth Chief of Defence Force
 Ng Chee Khern, former Chief of Air Force
 Ng Yat Chung, fifth Chief of Defence Force
 Phay Seng Whatt, former chairman of the Public Service Commission
 Sulaiman Sujak, first non-British Chief of the Royal Malaysian Air Force
 Syed Mohamed Ahmad Alsagoff, commander of the Malaysian Armed Forces in Singapore (1963–1965)
 Tee Tua Ba, former Commissioner of Police

Medicine
 Chew Chin Hin, medical practitioner and first Singaporean recipient of a Mastership in the American College of Physicians
 Kanwaljit Soin, orthopaedic surgeon and first female Nominated Member of Parliament

Education
 Law Song Seng, former director and first chief executive officer of the Institute of Technical Education
 Edwin Thumboo, first dean of the National University of Singapore Faculty of Arts and Social Sciences

Business
 Mohamed Salleh Marican, founding chairman and chief executive officer of Second Chance Properties
 Quek Leng Chan, co-founder of Hong Leong Financial Group
 G. Ramachandran, former president of the Singapore Indian Chamber of Commerce and Industry

Religion
 Sanusi Mahmood, first Mufti of Singapore
 Sik Kwang Sheng, former president of the Singapore Buddhist Federation and abbot of Kong Meng San Phor Kark See Monastery

Olympians
 Abdullah Hamid, Olympian (hockey), 1956 Summer Olympics
 Gan Eng Teck, Olympian (water polo), 1956 Summer Olympics
 William Douglas Hay, Olympian (hockey), 1956 Summer Olympics
 S. Jeyathurai, Olympian (hockey), 1956 Summer Olympics
 Calvin Kang, Olympian (athletics), 2008 Summer Olympics
 Ryan Lo, Olympian (sailing), 2020 Summer Olympics
 Kesavan Soon, Olympian (athletics), 1956 Summer Olympics
 Tan Wearn Haw, Olympian (sailing), 2000 Summer Olympics
 Gary Yeo, Olympian (athletics), 2012 Summer Olympics
 Arumugam Vijiaratnam, Olympian (hockey), 1956 Summer Olympics and the only Singaporean who had represented Singapore in hockey, football, cricket and rugby 

Other sportspersons
 Choo Seng Quee, former national football coach
 N. Ganesan, former chairman of the Football Association of Singapore
 Lau Teng Chuan, former secretary-general of the Singapore National Olympic Council
 Stacey Muruthi, former national cricket captain
 Vincent Subramaniam, former national football coach
 Tan Xiang Tian, champion of the 2015 World Wushu Championships

Arts, media, literature, etc.
 Boey Kim Cheng, poet and writer
 Colin Cheong, writer
 Iskandar Jalil, ceramist
 Sonny Liew, comic artist and illustrator
 Charlie Lim, singer-songwriter
 David Lim, music educator
 A. Samad Said, Malaysian novelist and poet
 T. Sasitharan, theatre practitioner and educator
 J C Sum, former illusionist and illusion designer
 Kelvin Tong, film director
 Daniel Yun, film producer

Others
 Chia Teck Leng, former manager of Asia Pacific Breweries and convicted white-collar criminal
 Willin Low, restaurateur and chef
 Ngiam Tee Liang, social work academic and former Nominated Member of Parliament
 Thomas Thomas, trade unionist and former Nominated Member of Parliament
 Anthony Yeo, counsellor and pioneer of the counselling profession in Singapore

See also
 Education in Singapore

References

Further reading
 Lim Fang York, "A sense of belonging, and other poems", 1979, Victoria School
 Lim Mu Yao, "Celebrating 130 years of Victoria School in Singapore", 2006, Victoria School
 "Victoria School art elective programme, 21 years", 2006, Victoria School; English 741.683095957 VIC, Lee Kong Chian Reference Library
 "Victoria Chorale", Victoria Chorale Victoria Chorale

External links

 

Secondary schools in Singapore
Autonomous schools in Singapore
Schools offering Integrated Programme in Singapore
Boys' schools in Singapore
Boarding schools in Singapore
Victoria schools, Singapore
Educational institutions established in 1876
Marine Parade
1876 establishments in Singapore